The Sandhayak-class survey ships are a series of eight vessels built by Garden Reach Shipbuilders and Engineers (GRSE), Kolkata and Goa Shipyard, Ltd., Vasco for the Indian Navy. While Sandhayak, Investigator, Nirdeshak, Nirupak were built in GRSE; Sarveshak, Jamuna, Darshak, Sutlej were built by Goa Shipyard. They have a helicopter deck and are also armed with a Bofors 40 mm/60 gun mount for self-defense.

The ships are equipped with variety of next-generation surveying systems fitted onboard including multi-beam swath echo sounding system, differential gps, motion sensors, sea gravimeter, magnetometer, oceanographic sensors, side scan sonars, automated data logging system, sound velocity profiling system, digital survey and processing system, amongst others.

Working as part of Indian Naval Hydrographic Department the Sandhayak-class survey ships are equipped with a range of surveying, navigational and communication systems. The ships are designed to undertake shallow coastal and deep oceanic hydrographic survey and collect oceanographic and geophysical data required for the production of digital navigational charts and publications. Besides carrying out their primary role of hydrographic survey, they can also assist in times of war and natural calamities as troop transports and casualty holding ships. The ships are  also equipped with ROV, AUV & USV. Nirdeshak was decommissioned in 2014.

Service History
 was decommissioned on 19 December 2014.

The lead ship of the class  was decommissioned on 4 June 2021 after 40 years in service.

Ships in the class

Gallery

See also
List of active Indian Navy ships

References

External links

 
Survey ships of the Indian Navy
Auxiliary research ship classes